Villa Gesell Partido is a partido on the Atlantic coast of Buenos Aires Province in Argentina.

Economy

The economy of Villa Gesell is dominated by the summer tourist season, which sees thousands of holidaymakers make their way to the Atlantic coast of Buenos Aires Province. The main tourist season lasts from December until February, after the end of the main holiday  season most of the hotels, bars and restaurants close up, but some of the local establishments and hostels remain open all year round.

History

In 1931 Don Carlos Idaho Gesell purchased  of sand dunes, and over the years he planted many thousands of trees and built a home for his family. Between the 1940s and the 1970s the population of Villa Gesell swelled as hippies and free thinkers fleeing the crowded metropolis of Buenos Aires made their way to the picturesque coastal village.

In the early years of Villa Gesell, Don Carlos Gesell introduced the "Plan galopante" (galloping plan) which meant if a householder would purchase a property inside Villa Gesell, and if they built a home within a specified period of time, a percentage of the purchase price would be discounted, in time bringing in thousands of people from around the world, especially Germany and Italy and other European nations, seeking a quiet and peaceful place to live.

Around 1970, Villa Gesell gained its status as a city, and as the settlement of Villa Gesell grew in popularity, commercial interests took over, spoiling Gesell's idea of a tranquil village surrounded by nature.

As the sand dunes were bulldozed to make space for seafront bars and restaurants, the settlement of Mar Azul was established in order to reestablish Gesell's ideal of urban development in tune with nature.

Since 2004, work has been undertaken to remove many of the concrete slab seafront bars and restaurants, in order to return the coastline of Villa Gesell to the state Gesell had intended.

Villa Gesell is host to "Le Touquet", one of the largest motocross races in the world. These races are held at nearby cities from time to time.

It has been said that "there is no better place to raise a family, than Villa Gesell".

Settlements

 Mar Azul
 Mar de las Pampas
 Las Gaviotas
 Villa Gesell

External links

Villa Gesell Partido Main Website (Spanish)
Federal Website (Spanish)

Partidos of Buenos Aires Province
1978 establishments in Argentina